The Junction is the twenty-third studio album by The Manhattan Transfer, released on March 30, 2018. This is their first album in nine years since their last album; The Chick Corea Songbook.

It was the first album by the group to feature Trist Curless on bass following the death of Tim Hauser in 2014.

Track listing

Personnel 
 Alan Paul, Cheryl Bentyne, Janis Siegel, Trist Curless – vocals (all tracks)
 Alan Paul – vocal arrangement (2, 9), keyboards (2)
 Mervyn Warren – vocal arrangement (all tracks), horn arrangement (2, 3, 9), string arrangement (6), drum programming (all tracks), keyboards (all tracks), bass (2)
 Brian Benning – strings (6, 9, 10)
 Don Breithaupt – keyboards (2), drum programming (2)
 Can Canbolat – strings (6, 10)
 Adam Dorn (credited as Mocean Worker) – keyboards (5), drum programming (5)
 Eddie Ellis – guitar (2)
 Brandon Fields – saxophone (2, 3, 9)
 Scott Frankfurt – drums (4), percussion (4)
 Yaron Gershovsky – piano (1)
 Christopher Harrison – keyboards (8), drum programming (8)
 Paul Jackson Jr. – guitar (1, 6, 9)
 Grace Kelly – saxophone (4)
 Luisito Quintero – percussion (7)
 Ray Reinebach – strings (10)
 Jen Simone – strings (6)
 Knox Summerour – flugelhorn (3), trumpet (9)

References

External links

The Manhattan Transfer albums
2018 albums